WVOM-FM (103.9 MHz) is a commercial FM radio station licensed to Howland, Maine and serving Central and Down East Maine, including Bangor.  It airs a talk radio format and is owned by Maine-based Blueberry Broadcasting which is headed by Louis Vitale and Bruce Biette.  WVOM-FM is known as "The Voice of Maine News/Talk Network."

The studios and offices are located on Target Industrial Circle in Bangor.  The transmitter, powered at 90,000 watts, is on a mountaintop near Burlington.  WVOM-FM is simulcast on WVQM (101.3 FM) in Augusta, which extends the station's programming to the capital region.

Programming

Weekdays
WVOM-FM airs a local morning drive information and talk program co-hosted by George Hale and Ric Tyler. Syndicated conservative talk shows follow, mostly from Premiere Networks.  They include The Glenn Beck Radio Program, Clay Travis & Buck Sexton, The Howie Carr Show, The Sean Hannity Show, Ground Zero with Clyde Lewis, and Coast to Coast AM with George Noory.  Most hours begin with world and national news from Fox News Radio.

Weekend
Local shows on weekends include "Hot and Cold with Tom Gocze." It is WVOM's longest running local program and originated in the 1989 on then-talk station AM 620 WZON.  It had been co-hosted by Gocze and Dr. Dick Hill, a mechanical engineering professor at the University of Maine for over 46 years.  A TV show was also seen on Maine Public Broadcasting Network, after being carried for many years on WVII/WFVX-LD. Gocze and Hill also wrote columns for the Bangor Daily News. In 2008 Hill scaled back his time on the program and later retired.

Other weekend programming includes The Kim Komando Show, The Car Doctor with Ron Ananian, Senior Talk, Financial Safari, Maine View, The Maine Outdoors, Somewhere in Time with Art Bell, the weekend version of Coast to Coast AM and the repeats of weekday shows from Rush Limbaugh, Sean Hannity, Glenn Beck and Howie Carr.

History

A construction permit for an FM station in Howland was granted by the Federal Communications Commission in 1989.  That permit carried the call sign WPVM, although it was never used on the air.  In 1992, the construction permit switched to WPRG, which also didn't make it to the air.

In June 1993, the station signed on as WSNV.  It aired an adult contemporary format and was owned by Bay Communications, Inc.

In 1997, the station was acquired by San Antonio-based Clear Channel Communications (later known as iHeartMedia).  Clear Channel switched the format to conservative talk, mostly featuring its own syndicated programs, and using CBS Radio News for world and national coverage.

WVOM and the other 16 Clear Channel stations in Maine were sold in August 2008 to Maine-based Blueberry Broadcasting which is headed by Louis Vitale and Bruce Biette.

WVOM-FM's programming was previously heard on WVOM (AM 1450) and FM translator W236DO (95.1) in Rockland, serving Midcoast Maine. The license for WVOM AM was surrendered to the FCC and cancelled on July 21, 2022. Translator W236DO’s license was surrendered and cancelled on the same day.

Past programming
"Tom and Charlie Show" was a wake up information program hosted by Tom Morelli and Charlie Horne from 1995 to 2000.  Originally carried from 6 to 10 am. Later, when Dr. Laura was moved to the 9 a.m. time slot, the morning show was moved back to 6 to 9 am. Morelli left in June 2000. Horne was let go three years later, after being paired with several other hosts.  The live coverage of the Ice Storm of 1998 was the high point of the morning show, and many details of this event were written about in a book.
"Back To Business" was a program designed to provide advice to Eastern Maine's small business community. The program was hosted by Deb Neuman of the University of Maine's Target Technology Incubator.  Neuman was awarded Small Business Journalist of the Year for Maine and New England by the US Small Business Administration. The show also has received a commendation from the United States Senate in September 2006.
"The Woof Meow Show" was hosted by Don Hanson and Kate Dutra of Green Acres Kennel Shop. The show focused on educating owners about their dogs and cats. Topics in the past have included: Dealing with a Barking Dog, Picking the Perfect Pet, Insurance Issues for Pets, Acupuncture for Pets, Pet Nutrition, Litter Box Training and many others.
Doctor Laura: Dropped in favor of Glenn Beck, program moved to WABI AM 910.
Jim Cramer's Real Money.
Bruce Williams, dropped in favor of Lars Larson.
NASCAR: Races moved to sister station WBFB.
Lars Larson, dropped in favor of Sean Hannity.
The Phil Hendrie Show: |Hendrie ended his original show in June 2006. Replaced by Coast to Coast AM rebroadcasts.
Maine Black Bears Sports (shared with WGUY). WVOM and WGUY were the flagship station for the 2007 & 2008 seasons. WVOM carried football, and hockey while then sister station WGUY carried men's and women's college basketball as well as select baseball and softball games Previous to the fall of 2007, the long-time home of University of Maine sports was ESPN Radio affiliate WZON.  However the university's student run radio station WMEB continues to carry home sports games, with their own announcers. With WGUY being sold, and sister station WWBX changing formats to sports, partially simulcasting Boston-based station WEEI, all game broadcasts moved to WWBX starting with the 2008 ice hockey season. WVOM however still carries the coaches interview shows.

References
bostonradio.org Radio history of Maine 1971-1996, also an audio collection and weekly columns.

External links

Hot and Cold

News and talk radio stations in the United States
VOM-FM
Radio stations established in 1993
Mass media in Penobscot County, Maine
1993 establishments in Maine
Blueberry Broadcasting radio stations